Summerside-St. Eleanors was a provincial electoral district for the Legislative Assembly of Prince Edward Island, Canada.

Members
The riding has elected the following Members of the Legislative Assembly:

Election results

Summerside-St. Eleanors, 1996–2019

2016 electoral reform plebiscite result

References

 Summerside-St. Eleanors information

Former provincial electoral districts of Prince Edward Island
Politics of Summerside, Prince Edward Island